Augustin Rabeasimbola (born 9 January 1988) is a Malagasy football midfielder who currently plays for USS Tamponnaise.

References

1988 births
Living people
Malagasy footballers
Madagascar international footballers
Academie Ny Antsika players
Japan Actuel's FC players
La Tamponnaise players
CNaPS Sport players
Pamplemousses SC players
Association football midfielders
Malagasy expatriate footballers
Expatriate footballers in Réunion
Malagasy expatriate sportspeople in Réunion
Expatriate footballers in Mauritius
Malagasy expatriate sportspeople in Mauritius
People from Antananarivo